Aleksandar Radovanović (born 11 November 1993) is a Serbian professional footballer who plays as a defender for Kortrijk.

Club career

Mačva Šabac
Born in Šabac, Radovanović started his career with local club Mačva, where he passed youth categories. He joined the first team of the club in the 2010–11, making 6 appearances in the Serbian League West. During the next season, Radovanović made 23 league appearances as a bonus player, and also scored his first senior goal for Mačva. After he overgrown youth selection, Radovanović continued playing with the first team, and during the 2012–13 Serbian League West season he was used four times on the field. As in each of two previous seasons, Radovanović also scored once in the 2013–14 season, during the 7 fixture match against Rudar Kostolac. After the club promoted in the Serbian First League in summer 2014, Radovanović started new season as a first choice centre-back, but missed some matches due to injury he earned in the 12 fixture match against Kolubara. He collected 23 league matches until the end of 2014–15 season. In summer 2015, he left the club.

OFK Beograd
In summer 2015, Radovanović joined Serbian SuperLiga side OFK Beograd, but missed the beginning of the 2015–16 season, due to administrative problems. He made his professional contract for OFK Beograd under coach Dragoljub Bekvalac in 16 fixture match of the season, against Red Star Belgrade. During the season, Radovanović made 15 league appearances at total, making an assist to Vuk Martinović in the 27 fixture match for 1–0 victory against Vojvodina.

Spartak Subotica
After he passed a trial period, playing pre-season matches with Spartak Subotica, Radovanović officially joined the club in July 2016 on a three-year contract. He made his debut for new club as a centre-back in opening match of the 2016–17 Serbian SuperLiga season against Voždovac, paired with Nemanja Ćalasan. Radovanović scored his first SuperLiga goal matchday 8 of the same season against Javor Ivanjica, played on 10 September 2016. In his first season with Spartak, Radovanović collected 31 appearances with one goal in all competitions at total under coach Andrey Chernyshov. Radovanović scored his second SuperLiga goal for Spartak in four fixture match of the 2017–18 season, against Javor Ivanjica. Radovanović also scored a twice in 4–2 victory over Radnički Niš. Radovanović realised penalty kick in a match against Borac Čačak on 19 November 2017, which was his forth goal in the season.

Vojvodina
On 22 January 2018, Radovanović signed a two-year-deal with Vojvodina. He officially promoted in new club by sporting director Saša Drakulić, choosing to wear number 66 jersey, previously ordered to Joseph Bempah, which he also wore in the previous club. Radovanović made his competitive debut for new club under coach Ilija Stolica in 2–0 victory over Voždovac on 17 February 2018. Radovanović collected 11 SuperLiga matches for Vojvodina until the end of season, scoring a single goal in 2–1 victory over Partizan on 29 April 2018.

Lens
On 26 June 2018, Radovanović signed a four-year deal with Lens, and the transfer fee was unofficially reported as €750,000. He has given number 26 jersey in new club.

Career statistics

Club

Honours
Mačva Šabac
Serbian League West: 2013–14

References

External links
 Aleksandar Radovanović stats at utakmica.rs 
 
 
 

1993 births
Living people
Sportspeople from Šabac
Association football defenders
Serbian footballers
FK Mačva Šabac players
OFK Beograd players
FK Spartak Subotica players
FK Vojvodina players
RC Lens players
K.V. Kortrijk players
Serbian First League players
Serbian SuperLiga players
Ligue 1 players
Ligue 2 players
Belgian Pro League players
Serbian expatriate footballers
Serbian expatriate sportspeople in France
Expatriate footballers in France
Serbian expatriate sportspeople in Belgium
Expatriate footballers in Belgium